Ellerslie Racecourse railway station was a station on the first railway line in Auckland, New Zealand. The line ran between central Auckland and the suburb (and port) of Onehunga. It is called the Onehunga Line today, and is one of the four lines of the Auckland railway network.

The platform provided access to the Ellerslie Racecourse.

The station or platform opened in January 1874. There was a suggestion in January 1878 that it should move to Greenlane, but the Jockey Club did not agree. It was closed in September 1971. The surfaces of the two side platforms were removed long ago and they are now grassed over, but the concrete abutments facing the tracks are still extant.

See also
Greenlane railway station

References

Defunct railway stations in New Zealand
Buildings and structures in Auckland
Rail transport in Auckland
Railway stations opened in 1874
Railway stations closed in 1971